Sepehr Tower is a 115 metre high building in Tehran, Iran. Sepehr Tower was Tehran's tallest building at the time of its completion at 33 floors.
It is located in Somayyeh St. close to the junction of Taleghani Ave and Dr. Mofatteh Street at coordinates .

The construction of the Tower was delayed for years due to the 1979 revolution. It now houses the head offices of Saderat Bank of Iran.

References 

Skyscraper office buildings in Iran
Towers in Iran
Buildings and structures in Tehran
Architecture in Iran